St Arnulf was Arnulf of Metz.

St Arnulf may also refer to:

Arnulf of Eynesbury (died 9th-century), 9th century hermit
Arnulf of Soissons

See also
St Arnold